The 1993 Austrian motorcycle Grand Prix was the fifth round of the 1993 Grand Prix motorcycle racing season. It took place on 16 May 1993 at the Salzburgring.

500 cc race report
Mick Doohan’s rear brake is now operated by a thumb-lever on the left side. This is to compensate for not being able to use the right foot lever because of injuries from Assen '92.

Kevin Schwantz’ 5th pole in a row. Luca Cadalora takes the start from Doug Chandler, Doohan, Alex Barros and Schwantz.

Wayne Rainey and Schwantz start swapping 4th position.

Doohan into 1st, but Schwantz takes over the lead, then it’s a gap back to Rainey and Barros. Rainey is happy with his third place after chatter and clutch trouble and having qualified 1.3 seconds behind Schwantz.

500cc classification

250cc classification

References

Austrian motorcycle Grand Prix
Austrian
Motorcycle Grand Prix